cAMP-specific 3',5'-cyclic phosphodiesterase 4C is an enzyme that in humans is encoded by the PDE4C gene.

Tissue localisation
PDE4C is predominantly found in peripheral tissues.

References

Further reading

External links